Rangri (also spelt Ranghri) is a dialect of the Haryanvi language spoken by Ranghar Muhajirs in Pakistani Punjab and small areas in Sindh.  It used to be spoken in Haryana in India, but nowadays it is only spoken in Pakistan.  It is spoken primarily in Lahore, Sheikhupura, Bhakkar, Bahawalnagar, Khanpur, Okara, Layyah, Vehari, Sahiwal, Phularwan, and Multan as well as Mirpur Khas and Nawabshah.

References 

Languages of Punjab, Pakistan
Languages of Sindh
Indo-Aryan languages
Haryanvi
Haryanavi culture